Megaphyllum is a genus of myriapods belonging to the family Julidae.

The species of this genus are found in Europe and Russia.

Species:
 Megaphyllum arcuatum
 Megaphyllum asiaminoris (Verhoeff, 1898)

References

Julida
Millipede genera